This is a list of lichens of Western Australia:

 Acarospora cervina
 Acarospora citrina
 Acarospora nodulosa
 Acarospora novae-hollandiae
 Acarospora sinopica
 Amandinea punctata
 Anisomeridium americanum
 Arthopyrenia analepta
 Arthothelium interveniens
 Aspicilia calcarea
 Aspicilia calcarea
 Australiaena streimannii
 Bacidia microphyllina
 Biatoropsis usnearum
 Buellia cretacea
 Buellia desertorum
 Buellia dijiana
 Buellia disciformis
 Buellia dissa
 Buellia epigaea
 Buellia farinulenta
 Buellia georgei
 Buellia glomerulans
 Buellia inturgescens
 Buellia lobata
 Buellia marginulata
 Buellia spuria
 Buellia stellulata
 Buellia stigmaea
 Buellia subalbula
 Buellia subcoronata
 Buellia subdisciformis
 Calicium abietinum
 Calicium glaucellum
 Calicium robustellum
 Calicium salicinum
 Calicium subquercinum
 Calicium tricolor
 Calicium victorianum
 Calicium victorianum
 Caloplaca cirrubescens
 Caloplaca cupulifera
 Caloplaca ferruginea
 Caloplaca flavorubescens
 Caloplaca granularis
 Caloplaca lactea
 Caloplaca lateritia
 Caloplaca leptozona
 Caloplaca luteoalba
 Caloplaca marina
 Caloplaca murorum
 Caloplaca murorum
 Candelaria concolor
 Candelariella vitellina
 Candelariella xanthostigma
 Candelariella xanthostigmoides
 Canomaculina subcaperata
 Canomaculina subsumpta
 Canoparmelia macrospora
 Canoparmelia owariensis
 Canoparmelia pruinata
 Canoparmelia subarida
 Catillaria chalybeia
 Catillaria lenticularis
 Catinaria atropurpurea
 Chaenotheca brunneola
 Chaenotheca carthusiae
 Chaenotheca chlorella
 Chaenotheca ferruginea
 Chaenothecopsis debilis
 Chaenothecopsis pusilla
 Chondropsis semiviridis
 Chrysothrix candelaris
 Cladia aggregata
 Cladia corallaizon
 Cladia ferdinandii
 Cladia inflata
 Cladia schizopora
 Cladia sullivanii
 Cladonia angustata
 Cladonia calyciformis
 Cladonia capitellata
 Cladonia capitellata
 Cladonia capitellata
 Cladonia cervicornis
 Cladonia chlorophaea
 Cladonia crispata
 Cladonia fimbriata
 Cladonia humilis
 Cladonia krempelhuberi
 Cladonia macilenta
 Cladonia merochlorophaea
 Cladonia pleurota
 Cladonia praetermissa
 Cladonia rigida
 Cladonia scabriuscula
 Cladonia southlandica
 Cladonia sulcata
 Cladonia sulcata
 Cladonia tessellata
 Clauzadeana macula
 Coccocarpia erythroxili
 Coccocarpia pellita
 Coelocaulon aculeatum
 Collema coccophorum
 Collema implicatum
 Collema leucocarpum
 Collema subconveniens
 Cyphelium trachylioides
 Degelia flabellata
 Dimelaena australiensis
 Dimelaena elevata
 Diploschistes almbornii
 Diploschistes euganeus
 Diploschistes gypsaceus
 Diploschistes hensseniae
 Diploschistes ocellatus
 Diploschistes scruposus
 Diploschistes sticticus
 Diploschistes thunbergianus
 Dirinaria aegialita
 Dirinaria applanata
 Dirinaria batavica
 Dirinaria confluens
 Dirinaria picta
 Endocarpon aridum
 Endocarpon helmsianum
 Endocarpon macrosporum
 Endocarpon pallidum
 Endocarpon pusillum
 Endocarpon robustum
 Endocarpon simplicatum
 Endocarpon simplicatum
 Ephebe lanata
 Flavoparmelia diffractaica
 Flavoparmelia ferax
 Flavoparmelia haysomii
 Flavoparmelia proeuplecta
 Flavoparmelia rutidota
 Flavoparmelia scabrosina
 Flavoparmelia secalonica
 Flavoparmelia soredians
 Flavoparmelia springtonensis
 Fuscidea cyathoides
 Gloeoheppia turgida
 Graphis afzelii
 Graphis scripta
 Haematomma eremaeum
 Haematomma similis
 Hafellia disciformis
 Hafellia dissa
 Hafellia reagens
 Heppia despreauxii
 Hertelidea pseudobotryosa
 Heterodea beaugleholei
 Heterodea muelleri
 Heterodermia dendritica
 Heterodermia japonica
 Heterodermia obscurata
 Heterodermia speciosa
 Hypocenomyce australis
 Hypocenomyce scalaris
 Hypogymnia lugubris
 Hypogymnia pulchrilobata
 Hypogymnia pulverata
 Hypogymnia subphysodes
 Imshaugia aleurites
 Lauderlindsaya borreri
 Lecanora arafurensis
 Lecanora arnhemica
 Lecanora austrointumescens
 Lecanora austrosorediosa
 Lecanora caesiorubella
 Lecanora elapheia
 Lecanora expallens
 Lecanora farinacea
 Lecanora flavidomarginata
 Lecanora flavopallida
 Lecanora helva
 Lecanora leprosa
 Lecanora lividocinerea
 Lecanora mayrhoferi
 Lecanora mobergiana
 Lecanora pallida
 Lecanora plumosa
 Lecanora pseudistera
 Lecanora rupicola
 Lecanora sphaerospora
 Lecanora tropica
 Lecidea capensis
 Lecidea contigua
 Lecidea fuscoatrula
 Lecidea hypnorum
 Lecidea multiflora
 Lecidea ochroleuca
 Lecidea sarcogynoides
 Lecidea tragorum
 Lecidea varians
 Lecidella stigmatea
 Lecidella sublapidica
 Leptogium corniculatum
 Leptogium phyllocarpum
 Letrouitia domingensis
 Lichina minutissima
 Megalospora occidentalis
 Menegazzia caesiopruinosa
 Menegazzia fertilis
 Menegazzia platytrema
 Microcalicium conversum
 Mycocalicium albonigricum
 Mycocalicium subtile
 Mycocalicium victoriae
 Mycoporum quercus
 Neofuscelia archeri
 Neofuscelia atrobarbatica
 Neofuscelia brattii
 Neofuscelia chudalupensis
 Neofuscelia convexa
 Neofuscelia glabrans
 Neofuscelia imitatrix
 Neofuscelia incantata
 Neofuscelia kondininensis
 Neofuscelia loxodella
 Neofuscelia luteonotata
 Neofuscelia pulla
 Neofuscelia remnantia
 Neofuscelia scabrosina
 Neofuscelia subbarbatica
 Neofuscelia subimitatrix
 Neofuscelia subprolixa
 Neofuscelia verrucella
 Normandina pulchella
 Ochrolechia pallescens
 Ochrolechia parella
 Ochrolechia subathallina
 Ochrolechia subpallescens
 Ochrolechia subrhodotropa
 Omphalina chromacea
 Omphalina umbellifera
 Pannaria obscura
 Pannoparmelia wilsonii
 Paraparmelia arida
 Paraparmelia atrocapnodes
 Paraparmelia bourgeanica
 Paraparmelia bourgeanica
 Paraparmelia conranensis
 Paraparmelia inconspicua
 Paraparmelia inselbergia
 Paraparmelia lumbschii
 Paraparmelia mongaensis
 Paraparmelia neoquintaria
 Paraparmelia saginata
 Paraparmelia sammyii
 Paraparmelia sargentii
 Paraparmelia subalpina
 Paraporpidia glauca
 Paraporpidia leptocarpa
 Parmelia erumpens
 Parmelina conlabrosa
 Parmelina endoleuca
 Parmelina labrosa
 Parmelina pseudorelicina
 Parmelina quercina
 Parmentaria microspora
 Parmotrema chinense
 Parmotrema cooperi
 Parmotrema praesorediosum
 Parmotrema pseudonilgherrense
 Parmotrema tinctorum
 Peltigera didactyla
 Peltigera dolichorrhiza
 Peltigera polydactyla
 Peltula bolanderi
 Peltula cylindrica
 Peltula euploca
 Peltula impressa
 Peltula langei
 Peltula obscurans
 Peltula omphaliza
 Peltula patellata
 Peltula placodizans
 Peltula radicata
 Peltula rodriguesii
 Peltula subglebosa
 Peltula zahlbruckneri
 Pertusaria gibberosa
 Pertusaria leioplacella
 Pertusaria remota
 Pertusaria scaberula
 Pertusaria thiophaninica
 Pertusaria thiospoda
 Pertusaria trachyspora
 Pertusaria trimera
 Phacopsis oxyspora
 Phaeophyscia endococcinodes
 Phaeophyscia orbicularis
 Phloeopeccania australiensis
 Physcia aipolia
 Physcia alba
 Physcia alboplumbea
 Physcia caesia
 Physcia stellaris
 Physcia tribacia
 Physcia virella
 Physconia distorta
 Placidium squamulosum
 Placopsis perrugosa
 Polysporina simplex
 Porina guentheri
 Porina hyperleptalea
 Porina kantvilasii
 Porocyphus lichinelloides
 Porpidia macrocarpa
 Pseudocyphellaria aurata
 Pseudocyphellaria billardierei
 Pseudocyphellaria crocata
 Pseudocyphellaria neglecta
 Psora crystallifera
 Psora decipiens
 Punctelia subalbicans
 Punctelia subflava
 Punctelia subrudecta
 Pyrrhospora laeta
 Pyxine australiensis
 Pyxine coccifera
 Pyxine cocoes
 Pyxine convexior
 Pyxine petricola
 Pyxine plumea
 Pyxine subcinerea
 Ramalea cochleata
 Ramalina australiensis
 Ramalina canariensis
 Ramalina celastri
 Ramalina fissa
 Ramalina glaucescens
 Ramalina ootropica
 Ramalina subfraxinea
 Ramalina subfraxinea
 Ramboldia petraeoides
 Ramboldia stuartii
 Relicinopsis rahengensis
 Rhizocarpon geographicum
 Rhizocarpon polycarpum
 Rhizocarpon tinei
 Rimelia reticulata
 Rinodina bischoffii
 Rinodina conradii
 Rinodina gennarii
 Rinodina thiomela
 Rinodina xanthomelana
 Rinodinella halophila
 Roccella montagnei
 Sarcogyne clavus
 Sarcogyne privigna
 Siphula coriacea
 Solenopsora vulturiensis
 Sphinctrina leucopoda
 Spilonema paradoxum
 Stereocaulon corticatulum
 Teloschistes chrysophthalmus
 Teloschistes sieberianus
 Tephromela arafurensis
 Tephromela atra
 Thelotrema lepadinum
 Thysanothecium hccii
 Thysanothecium scutellatum
 Toninia australiensis
 Toninia caeruleonigricans
 Toninia cumulata
 Trapelia coarctata
 Trapelia mooreana
 Trypethelium eluteriae
 Umbilicaria polyphylla
 Usnea confusa
 Usnea inermis
 Usnea maculata
 Usnea pulvinata
 Usnea scabrida
 Usnea subeciliata
 Usnea undulata
 Verrucaria baldensis
 Verrucaria calciseda
 Verrucaria compacta
 Verrucaria maura
 Verrucaria microsporoides
 Verrucaria subdiscreta
 Xanthoparmelia alternata
 Xanthoparmelia antleriformis
 Xanthoparmelia arapilensis
 Xanthoparmelia australasica
 Xanthoparmelia bungendorensis
 Xanthoparmelia burmeisteri
 Xanthoparmelia centralis
 Xanthoparmelia cheelii
 Xanthoparmelia concomitans
 Xanthoparmelia congensis
 Xanthoparmelia congesta
 Xanthoparmelia constipata
 Xanthoparmelia convolutella
 Xanthoparmelia cravenii
 Xanthoparmelia darlingensis
 Xanthoparmelia dayiana
 Xanthoparmelia dichotoma
 Xanthoparmelia digitiformis
 Xanthoparmelia dissitifolia
 Xanthoparmelia donneri
 Xanthoparmelia eilifii
 Xanthoparmelia elixii
 Xanthoparmelia everardensis
 Xanthoparmelia exillima
 Xanthoparmelia filsonii
 Xanthoparmelia flindersiana
 Xanthoparmelia fumigata
 Xanthoparmelia furcata
 Xanthoparmelia gerhardii
 Xanthoparmelia glareosa
 Xanthoparmelia globulifera
 Xanthoparmelia gongylodes
 Xanthoparmelia hybridiza
 Xanthoparmelia hypoleia
 Xanthoparmelia hypoleiella
 Xanthoparmelia incerta
 Xanthoparmelia incrustata
 Xanthoparmelia isidiosa
 Xanthoparmelia kalbarriensis
 Xanthoparmelia kosciuszkoensis
 Xanthoparmelia lineola
 Xanthoparmelia louisii
 Xanthoparmelia louisii
 Xanthoparmelia metaclystoides
 Xanthoparmelia mexicana
 Xanthoparmelia microcephala
 Xanthoparmelia molliuscula
 Xanthoparmelia mougeotina
 Xanthoparmelia nana
 Xanthoparmelia nashii
 Xanthoparmelia neotinctina
 Xanthoparmelia norpraegnans
 Xanthoparmelia norpumila
 Xanthoparmelia norstrigosa
 Xanthoparmelia notata
 Xanthoparmelia oleosa
 Xanthoparmelia parvoclystoides
 Xanthoparmelia parvoincerta
 Xanthoparmelia pertinax
 Xanthoparmelia praegnans
 Xanthoparmelia prodomokosii
 Xanthoparmelia pumila
 Xanthoparmelia pustuliza
 Xanthoparmelia remanens
 Xanthoparmelia reptans
 Xanthoparmelia rupestris
 Xanthoparmelia subcrustacea
 Xanthoparmelia subdistorta
 Xanthoparmelia subnuda
 Xanthoparmelia substrigosa
 Xanthoparmelia succedans
 Xanthoparmelia taractica
 Xanthoparmelia tasmanica
 Xanthoparmelia tegeta
 Xanthoparmelia terrestris
 Xanthoparmelia versicolor
 Xanthoparmelia weberi
 Xanthoparmelia weberiella
 Xanthoparmelia willisii
 Xanthoparmelia xanthofarinosa
 Xanthoparmelia xanthomelaena
 Xanthoparmelia xanthomelanoides
 Xanthoparmelia yowaensis
 Xanthoria ligulata
 Xanthoria parietina

References
 https://web.archive.org/web/20110606032906/http://www.biologie.uni-hamburg.de/checklists/lichens/australia%26new-zealand/australia_western-australia_l.htm

Lichens